Plan B is the eighth studio album by American rock band Huey Lewis and the News, released in 2001.

This was the last album to feature founding member/guitarist Chris Hayes, who performed on the album but then left after work was completed. It was also the last News album for Ron Stallings, who died in 2009.

Track listing
"We're Not Here for a Long Time (We're Here for a Good Time)" (Johnny Colla, Chris Hayes, Huey Lewis) – 3:53
"My Other Woman" (Colla, Lewis) – 4:06
"I Ain't Perfect" (Bill Gibson, Lewis) – 4:33
"When I Write the Book" (cover of Rockpile) (Billy Bremner, Dave Edmunds, Nick Lowe) – 3:44
"I'm Not in Love Yet" (Duet with Wynonna) (Hayes, Lewis) – 4:28
"Thank You, No. 19" (Sean Hopper, Lewis) – 4:52
"Plan B" (Colla, Lewis) – 3:27
"The Rhythm Ranch" (Colla, Lewis) – 4:49
"Let Her Go and Start Over" (Mike Duke) – 4:47
"I Never Think About You" (Hayes, Lewis, John Pierce) – 5:16
"So Little Kindness" (Hayes, Lewis, Rob Sudduth) – 4:21
Re-recording; original version on Time Flies

Bonus track (Japan release)
"Plan B" (Live)

Personnel
Huey Lewis and the News
 Huey Lewis – harmonica, lead vocals
 Johnny Colla – guitar, saxophone, backing vocals
 Bill Gibson – drums
 Chris Hayes – lead guitar, backing vocals
 Ric Wilson – rhythm guitar, backing vocals
 Sean Hopper – keyboards, piano, backing vocals
 John Pierce – bass

The Sports Section
 Marvin McFadden – trumpet
 Ron Stallings – tenor saxophone
 Rob Sudduth – baritone saxophone, tenor saxophone

Additional personnel
 Wynonna Judd – vocals on "I'm Not in Love Yet"
 Jack Jacobsen – organ, acoustic piano
 Jim Pugh – organ
 Dallis Craft – backing vocals

Production
 Producers – Huey Lewis and Johnny Colla
 Engineers – David Boucher, Johnny Colla, Huey Lewis, Merrit Pelkey and Jim "Watts" Vereecke.
 Mixed by Bob Clearmountain
 Digital Editing – Chris Haggerty
 Mastered by Robert Hadley and Doug Sax at The Mastering Lab (Hollywood, California).
 Photography – Aaron Rapoport

Charts

References

2001 albums
Huey Lewis and the News albums